Arthur Segal may refer to:
 Arthur Segal (painter) (1875–1944), Romanian abstract artist
 Arthur Segal (archaeologist) (born 1946), Polish-born Israeli archaeologist